The  (Spanish for "hill group") was a military anti-communist right wing death squad created in Peru that was active from 1990 until 1994, during the administration of president Alberto Fujimori.

Background
In 1980, Peruvian Maoist Abimael Guzman launched a guerrilla war with his group Shining Path.  This war, as well as a war launched by the leftist group known as the Túpac Amaru Revolutionary Movement continued into the 1990s, when Alberto Fujimori was elected president. It was then that suspected guerrillas and civilians began dying at the hands of Grupo Colina.

The Grupo Colina, under the mandate of Fujimori, victimized trade unions and activists that spoke out against the Peruvian government, by intimidation or sometimes murder.

Investigations
When the Democratic Constitutional Congress investigated the La Cantuta massacre, Nicolás Hermoza Ríos, Commander General of the Armed Forces, put tanks on the streets and declared that he would not tolerate the Congress insulting the armed forces. The Congress largely backed down.

Later, some members of Grupo Colina were put on trial. Fujimori signed a controversial law that granted amnesty to anyone accused of, tried for, convicted of, or sentenced for human rights violations that were committed by the armed forces or police. When a court found this law unconstitutional, Fujimori signed a new law removing the right of judicial review over amnesty laws. This second law was known as the "Barrios Altos Law" because it ensured that those members of Grupo Colina who committed the Barrios Altos massacre would be freed. Eventually, the Inter-American Court of Human Rights struck down both amnesty laws.

Since the collapse of the Fujimori government, several people have been tried for Grupo Colina's crimes, including Fujimori himself, who was tried and convicted for the La Cantuta massacre and the Barrios Altos massacre. Testimony in defense of Fujimori has been offered by group leaders, Jesús Sosa Saavedra and Santiago Martin Rivas, who claim that Fujimori was an unwitting participant in Grupo Colina's actions. Other trials have established that Grupo Colina was not an informal group of renegade officers but an organic part of the Peruvian state. Julio Salazar, former de jure chief of the National Intelligence Service (SIN), was sentenced to thirty-five years of prison for his role in the La Cantuta massacre. During Salazar's tenure at the SIN, Vladimiro Montesinos was the de facto SIN chief and national security advisor. Montesinos is currently imprisoned in the Callao Military Prison outside of Lima and faces over seventy trials for various human rights abuses, as well as charges of arms trafficking, drug trafficking, and political corruption. The operational chief of Grupo Colina, Santiago Martín Rivas, is also imprisoned.

Members 

 Fernando Rodríguez Zabalbeascoa (Chief) (25 year sentence)
 Santiago Martín Rivas (Operational Chief) (35 year sentence)
 Carlos Pichinlingüe Guevara (Deputy Chief) (25 year sentence)
 Jesús Mateo Sosa Saavedra (agent) (55 year sentence)
 Rogelio Carbajal García (agent) (25 year sentence)
 Arturo Pino Díaz (agent) (35 year sentence)
 Wilmer Yarlequé Ordinola (agent) (25 year sentence)
 Orlando Vera Naverrete (agent) (25 year sentence)
 Fernando Lecca Esquén (agent) (25 year sentence)
 Héctor Alvarado (agent) (25 year sentence)
 Hiver Arteaga (agent) (25 year sentence)
 José Concepción (agent) (25 year sentence)
 José Alarcón Gonzales (agent) (25 year sentence)
 Rolando Meneses Montes de Oca (agent) (15 year sentence)
 Jorge Ortiz Mantas (agent) (15 year sentence)
 Ángel Sauñi Pomaya (agent) (15 year sentence)
 Hércules Gómez Casanova (agent) (15 year sentence)
 José Tena Jacinto (agent) (15 year sentence)
 Pablo Atúncar Cama (agent) (15 year sentence)
 Marco Flores Albán (agent) (15 year sentence)
 Isaac Paquiyauri Huaytalla (agent) (15 year sentence)
 Julio Chuqui Aguirre (agent) (15 year sentence)

See also
Rodrigo Franco Command

Notes

External links
Amnesty International report on Peru.
APRODEH. The La Cantuta Case.
APRODEH. The Barrios Altos Case.
APRODEH. Basements of the SIE.
APRODEH. The Santa Case.
APRODEH. The Yauri Case.
APDODEH. The Ventocilla Case.
Truth and Reconciliation Commission.El Destacamento Colina.

Human rights abuses
Internal conflict in Peru
Political repression in Peru
Anti-communist terrorism